The Institut Culturel Franco-Japonais – École Japonaise de Paris ("French-Japanese Cultural Institute - Japanese School of Paris" - Japanese: 日仏文化学院パリ日本人学校 Nichifutsu Bunka Gakuin Pari Nihonjin Gakkō) is a Japanese international school located in Montigny-le-Bretonneux, France, in the Paris Metropolitan Area. The school is located in proximity to Versailles. Japanese is the primary language of instruction while students also take French classes.

The school serves ages 6 through 15. Marie Conte-Holm, author of The Japanese and Europe: Economic and Cultural Encounters, wrote that the bus route to and from the school "essentially determines" where Japanese families with children settle in Greater Paris. She also wrote that "While some Japanese children attend local schools for a proportion of their time in France, even the more internationally minded Japanese parents will transfer their offspring to the Japanese School for reorientation during the latter part of their stay."

 the school is led by Principal Onoe (小野江 校長).

History
The Japanese Chamber of Commerce and Industry established the Japanese School in 1973. It was located in Trocadéro in the 16th arrondissement of Paris and it had opened with 100 students. In the 1980s the school expanded rapidly. In 1990 it moved to a building that had been erected to serve as the Japanese school. Japanese companies had funded the new school building. That year, the school had 563 students in elementary school and junior high school. In 1991 it had 500 students, around the time of its peak enrollment and the time of peak investment from Japanese companies. Since then a Japanese recession occurred. In 2013 the school had 380 students.

Operations and curriculum
The school committee overseeing the school includes representatives of Japanese companies with offices in the Paris area. The tuition paid by parents is comparable to tuition at Japanese private schools.

The school emphasizes the maintenance and cultivation of Japaneseness in its students while also promoting international understanding. As part of the latter, the school has its ninth grade students participate in class exchange visits with area French schools, and the Japanese school and the French schools partake in events in the School Festival compete in the Annual Sports Day. In addition, the Japanese school offers Saturday morning Japanese classes to the local community.

Curriculum
The Japanese Ministry of Education sets the curriculum, which is intended to provide a Japanese-style education and allow students to re-enter Japanese schools. The ministry also sends teachers to teach at the Japanese school. The school has no Saturday morning programme so seven classes per day are offered instead of six.  The local authority requires the school to offer French classes for two to three hours per week, so the school uses French and Japanese French-language teachers.

Transport
The school runs eight daily buses throughout the Paris area to pick up and drop off students.

See also

 Japanese community of Paris
 Japanese people in France
 Lycée Konan - Defunct Japanese boarding school near Tours
 Lycée Seijo - Defunct Japanese boarding school in Alsace

References
 Conte-Helm, Marie. The Japanese and Europe: Economic and Cultural Encounters (Bloomsbury Academic Collections). A&C Black, December 17, 2013. , 9781780939803.

Notes

Further reading
  Ikezaki, Kimie (池崎 喜美惠 Ikezaki Kimie; Tokyo Gakugei University). "The view of home life and home economics of the students in the Japanese School : The case of the Japanese School in London and the Institut Cultural Franco-Japonais" (Archive: 日本人学校の児童・生徒の家庭生活観と家庭科観 : ロンドンおよびパリ日本人学校の事例をもとに). Bulletin of Tokyo Gakugei University, Educational sciences (東京学芸大学紀要. 総合教育科学系), Tokyo Gakugei University. 58, 361-369, 2007-02. English abstract (Archive). See profile at CiNii, See profile at Tokyo Gakugei University.
 Watanabe, Shunzo (渡辺 俊三 Watanabe Shunzō), et al. "A Study on the Adjustment of Pupils in Japanese Elementary and Junior High School in Paris" (日本人学校児童(フランス)の適応構造). The Hirosaki Medical Journal (弘前醫學) 36(1), 167-175, 1984-03. Hirosaki University. See profile at CiNii.
 Yokoyama, Kazuhiro (横山 和弘 Yokoyama Kazuhiro). "パリ日本人学校における現地校交流の実践 : 異文化交流をどのように行うかの考察." 在外教育施設における指導実践記録 23, 115-118, 2000. Tokyo Gakugei University. See profile at CiNii.
 岩崎 保. "パリそしてパリ--元パリ日本人学校長の回想." Journal of overseas education (海外の教育). 25(2), 131-139, 1999-04. 全国海外教育事情研究会.
 楠本 満 (前パリ日本人学校:長崎県佐世保市立早岐中学校). "フランス在外教育施設「パリ日本人学校での取り組みから」(国際理解教育・現地理解教育)." 在外教育施設における指導実践記録 33, 114-117, 2010-12-24. Tokyo Gakugei University. See profile at CiNii.
 菅沢 和広. "仏蘭西・巴里よもやま話--パリ日本人学校から." 宮城教育大学国語国文 (23), 40-43, 1995-12. 宮城教育大学国語国文学会. See profile at CiNii.
 寺内 礼治郎. "パリ日本人学校." 児童心理 33(1), p172-178, 1979-01. 金子書房. See profile at CiNii.

External links

 Institut culturel franco-japonais 
  
  

Private schools in France
Paris
International schools in Île-de-France
Schools in Saint-Quentin-en-Yvelines
Paris
Secondary schools in France
1973 establishments in France
Educational institutions established in 1973